Robert W. Davison (born May 1, 1980) is a Canadian professional ice hockey coach and former  player. A defenceman, Davison played for the San Jose Sharks, New York Islanders, Vancouver Canucks, and New Jersey Devils of the National Hockey League (NHL). He is currently serving as assistant coach of the Toronto Marlies, the American Hockey League  affiliate of the Toronto Maple Leafs.

Playing career
Davison began his junior career in the Ontario Provincial Junior A Hockey League, for the St. Michael's Buzzers in 1996-97.  The following year, he joined the North Bay Centennials of the major junior Ontario Hockey League.  After posting 11 points in 59 games, he was drafted by the San Jose Sharks in the fourth round, 98th overall, in the 1998 NHL Entry Draft.  Davison returned to North Bay for another two seasons before making his professional debut with the Sharks' minor league affiliate, the Kentucky Thoroughblades of the American Hockey League in 2000–01.

The following season, the Thoroughblades relocated from Kentucky and became the Cleveland Barons.  Davison scored his first professional goal that season, in 2001–02.

In 2002–03, following the trade of defenceman Bryan Marchment, Davison was called up from Cleveland and made his NHL debut with the Sharks.  In his third game, he scored his first NHL goal against Martin Gerber in a 3-2 overtime loss to the Mighty Ducks of Anaheim. Davison finished the season with 3 points in 15 games with San Jose.

During the 2004–05 NHL lockout, Davison played in the UK's Elite Ice Hockey League with the Cardiff Devils.  He recorded 7 goals (second among team defencemen) and 15 points in 50 games as the Devils finished the season as Challenge Cup runners-up.

When NHL play resumed the following season, in 2005–06, Davison scored a career-high 6 points in 69 games.  He remained with the Sharks until February 26, 2008, when he was traded to the New York Islanders in exchange for a seventh round draft pick (Jason Demers) in 2008.

On March 18, 2008, in a game against the Toronto Maple Leafs, Davison scored one of the longest goals in NHL history when a shorthanded clearing attempt from around his own goal line took several bounces along the ice before skipping over the glove of goalie and former Sharks teammate Vesa Toskala and into the net for the Islanders' lone tally in a 3–1 loss. The 197-foot shot was only Davison's third goal in 187 career games.

After one season with the Islanders, he was signed by the Vancouver Canucks to a one-year, $560,000 deal on July 10, 2008, as an unrestricted free agent.  Davison was acquired by his former agent Mike Gillis, the newly appointed general manager of the Canucks.

On July 31, 2009, Davison was signed by the New Jersey Devils. Davison played one game for the Devils in the current season, spending most of his time with the AHL's Lowell Devils.

After two seasons abroad in Europe with HC Oceláři Třinec and EC Red Bull Salzburg, Davison returned to the San Jose Sharks, his original draft team, on a one-year, two-way contract on July 7, 2013. Davison served as the Captain of  the Sharks' AHL affiliate Worcester Sharks, and on December 31, 2013 against the Adirondack Phantoms, he played his 700th career professional game; 345 were in the AHL, 219 were in the NHL, and 136 were in Europe.

Coaching career 
On July 26, 2014, Davison retired to become an assistant coach with EC Red Bull Salzburg. After a two-year stint, and two championships in Salzburg, he left the team at the conclusion of the 2015–16 season and joined the coaching staff of HC Dinamo Minsk of the Kontinental Hockey League (KHL) as an assistant.
On July 17, 2017, Davison was appointed assistant coach of the Toronto Marlies, winning the Calder Cup in the 2017–18 season.

Career statistics

Awards and achievements
North Bay Centennials Defensive Player of the Year - 2000
North Bay Centennials Scholastic Player of the Year - 2000
European Trophy Champion 2011 (Captain)
Austrian Champion 2015
EBEL Champion 2015
Austrian Champion 2016
EBEL Champion 2016
Calder Cup Champion 2018

References

External links 

1980 births
Albany Devils players
Canadian ice hockey defencemen
Cardiff Devils players
Cleveland Barons (2001–2006) players
EC Red Bull Salzburg players
HC Oceláři Třinec players
Sportspeople from St. Catharines
Kentucky Thoroughblades players
Living people
New Jersey Devils players
New York Islanders players
North Bay Centennials players
San Jose Sharks draft picks
San Jose Sharks players
Vancouver Canucks players
Worcester Sharks players
Ice hockey people from Ontario
Canadian expatriate sportspeople in Belarus
Canadian expatriate ice hockey players in the United States
Canadian expatriate ice hockey players in Wales
Canadian expatriate ice hockey players in the Czech Republic
Canadian expatriate ice hockey players in Austria
Canadian ice hockey coaches